Wallace Downey (New York City, May 14, 1902 – New York City, January 29, 1978) was an American film producer and director.

In 1928 Wallace Downey, an executive of Columbia Records, was sent to South America to install a Brazilian branch for his company. He quickly realized Brazil  was an entertainment hot bed for potential markets in records and films.

In 1931 Downey produced and directed,  Coisas Nossas, the first successful Brazilian film with sound. His 1935 film, Hello, Hello Brazil!, first introduced radio singer and actress Carmen Miranda to a larger audience paving the way to her international fame at 20th Century Fox in the United States.

Downey later founded his own production company, Waldow S.A., in a partnership with  Cinédia, producing musical films.

In 1938 Downey disbanded Waldow S.A., using the resources to create a new  production company, Sonofilms.

Selected filmography

Director
 Nossas Coisas (1931)
 Alô, Alô Brasil (1935)
 Estudantes (1935)

Producer
 Nossas Coisas (1931)
 Alô, Alô Brasil (1935)
 Estudantes (1935)
 Alô, Alô, Carnaval   (1936)
 Banana da Terra (1936)

References

External links 
 

1902 births
1967 deaths
American film producers
American film directors
20th-century American businesspeople